Paranemachilus genilepis is a species of stone loach endemic to China.  This species can reach a length of  SL.  It is also found in the aquarium trade.

References

Nemacheilidae
Fish of Asia
Fish described in 1983